The European qualifying competition for the 2023 FIFA Women's World Cup was a women's football competition that determined the eleven UEFA teams which directly qualified for the final tournament in Australia and New Zealand, and the one team which advanced to the inter-confederation play-offs.

Fifty-one of the 55 UEFA member national teams entered the qualifying competition, with Cyprus making their World Cup qualifying debut and Luxembourg appearing in a group stage for the first time ever.

Format
The qualifying competition consists of two rounds:
Group stage: The 51 teams were drawn into nine groups of five or six teams, where each group was played in a home-and-away round-robin format. The nine group winners qualified directly for the final tournament, while the nine runners-up advanced to the play-offs.
Play-offs: The nine teams played two knockout rounds of single-leg matches, with the best three runners-up entering in the second round, to determine the two additional qualified teams and one inter-continental play-offs entrant from UEFA, based on combined records in both the group stage and play-offs.

Tiebreakers
In the group stage, teams were ranked according to points (3 points for a win, 1 point for a draw, 0 points for a loss), and if tied on points, the following tiebreaking criteria were applied, in the order given, to determine the rankings (Regulations Article 13.01):
Points in head-to-head matches among tied teams;
Goal difference in head-to-head matches among tied teams;
Goals scored in head-to-head matches among tied teams;
If more than two teams were tied, and after applying all head-to-head criteria above, a subset of teams was still tied, all head-to-head criteria above were reapplied exclusively to this subset of teams;
Goal difference in all group matches;
Goals scored in all group matches;
Away goals scored in all group matches;
Wins in all group matches;
Away wins in all group matches;
Disciplinary points (red card = 3 points, yellow card = 1 point, expulsion for two yellow cards in one match = 3 points);
UEFA coefficient for the group stage draw.

To determine the best three runners-up, the group standings were used, not taking into account any matches against sixth-placed teams. If teams were tied on points, the following tiebreaking criteria were applied (Regulations Article 14.04):
Goal difference in all group matches;
Goals scored in all group matches;
Away goals scored in all group matches;
Wins in all group matches;
Away wins in all group matches;
Disciplinary points (red card = 3 points, yellow card = 1 point, expulsion for two yellow cards in one match = 3 points);
UEFA coefficient for the group stage draw.

In the play-offs, the team that scored more goals in the second round match qualified for the final tournament. If the score was level, extra time was played. If the score remained level after extra time, the tie was decided by penalty shoot-out (Regulations Article 15.01).

To determine the two best play-off winners, the results of the group stage as used for runner-up determination above (eight matches), and the second round of the play-offs (one match) were added. The following criteria were applied (Regulations Article 14.05):
Points;
Goal difference;
Goals scored;
Away goals scored;
Wins;
Away wins;
Disciplinary points;
UEFA coefficient for the group stage draw.

Schedule
The qualifying matches were played on dates that fell within the FIFA Women's International Match Calendar.

Since the UEFA Women's Euro 2022 tournament was moved from summer 2021 to that of 2022 because of the COVID-19 pandemic in Europe, for the first time the series of matches for UEFA's World Cup qualification were interrupted by a continental championship. In July 2022 sixteen UEFA national teams participated in the Women's Euro tournament in England.

Entrants
The teams were ranked according to their coefficient ranking, calculated based on the following (Regulations Annex B.1.2.a):
UEFA Women's Euro 2017 final tournament and qualifying competition (20%)
2019 FIFA Women's World Cup final tournament and qualifying competition (40%)
UEFA Women's Euro 2022 qualifying competition (group stage only, excluding play-offs) (40%)

One entrant, Russia, was initially given a four-year ban from all major sporting events by the World Anti-Doping Agency (WADA) on 9 December 2019 after Russian Anti-Doping Agency (RUSADA) was found non-compliant for handing over manipulated laboratory data to investigators. However, the Russian women's team could still have entered qualification. The decision was appealed to the Court of Arbitration for Sport (CAS), which ruled in WADA's favour but reduced the ban to two years. The CAS ruling also allowed the name "Russia" to be displayed on uniforms if the words "Neutral Athlete" or "Neutral Team" had equal prominence. Had Russia qualified for the tournament, its female players would have been able to use their country's name, flag and anthem at the Women's World Cup, unlike their male counterparts, as the ban was set to expire on 16 December 2022. However, Russia were suspended from the tournament following the 2022 Russian invasion of Ukraine, and later expelled from all ongoing FIFA and UEFA competitions.

On 20 April 2021, it was announced 51 teams from the 55 eligible would enter the qualifying round.

National teams which qualified directly for the final tournament were indicated in bold, national teams which qualified for the final tournament through the UEFA play-offs were indicated in bold italics, and the national team which qualified for the inter-confederation play-offs was indicated in italics.

Group stage

Draw
The draw for the group stage was held on 30 April 2021 at the UEFA headquarters in Nyon, Switzerland. The 51 teams were drawn into 9 groups:
 3 groups (Groups A, B, C) of 5 teams (playing a total of 8 matches), containing one team each from Pots 1–5.
 6 groups (Groups D, E, F, G, H, I) of 6 teams (playing a total of 10 matches), containing one team each from Pots 1–6.

Based on the UEFA Executive Committee decisions due to political conflicts, there were several combinations of teams (Armenia and Azerbaijan, Russia and Ukraine, Serbia and Kosovo, Bosnia and Herzegovina and Kosovo, Russia and Kosovo) that could not be drawn into the same group. One of these was Armenia, who were initially drawn into group E together with Azerbaijan. Armenia was moved into group F and Montenegro was then drawn into group E.

Groups

Group A

Group B

Group C

Group D

Group E

On 28 February 2022, FIFA and UEFA announced that Russia was suspended from all competitions. On 2 May 2022, UEFA announced that Russia would no longer be allowed to take part in the competition, that their previous results were nullified, and that Group E would continue with five teams.

Group F

Group G

Group H

Group I

Ranking of second-placed teams
Since some groups had six teams and others had five, matches against the sixth-placed team in the groups with six teams were not counted.

Play-offs

Draw

Bracket

Round 1

Round 2

Ranking of play-off winners

Qualified teams
The following twelve teams from UEFA qualified for the final tournament.

1 Bold indicates champions for that year. Italic indicates hosts for that year.

Top goalscorers

For full lists of goalscorers, see sections in each group:

Group A
Group B
Group C
Group D
Group E
Group F
Group G
Group H
Group I
Play-offs

References

External links
FIFA Women's World Cup, UEFA.com

 
2023 FIFA Women's World Cup qualification
2023
2021 in women's association football
2022 in women's association football
Women's World Cup qualification
Women's World Cup qualification
September 2021 sports events in Europe
October 2021 sports events in Europe
November 2021 sports events in Europe
April 2022 sports events in Europe
August 2022 sports events in Europe
June 2022 sports events in Europe
September 2022 sports events in Europe
October 2022 sports events in Europe
Sports events affected by the 2022 Russian invasion of Ukraine